Keon Chia Hsieh (born February 24, 1985) is a Malaysian songwriter, singer, arranger and producer. Originally from Miri, Sarawak, he currently resides in Kuala Lumpur.

Early life 
Hsieh was born into a family with a background in politics in Sarawak. His great-grandfather, Tzuchen Hsieh, was a prominent figure in the early Chinese community of Miri, Sarawak. His grandfather, Datuk Chinhsin Hsieh, served as a member of parliament and Assistant Director of the Ministry of Welfare. Following his retirement, he was appointed by the state government as the Chinese Temenggong of Miri Province.

Hsieh's father, Tunfa Hsieh, won two championships in the Astro Senior Singing Competition in 2003 and encouraged his son's interest in pursuing a career in music. Hsieh's mother, Meimei Kuan, is a singing instructor, and all members of the family share a passion for music and singing. Hsieh started writing songs at the age of 15 after learning guitar and piano, and has received unwavering support from his parents in expressing his musical talent. His father taught him how to sing and play songs, and his mother-in-law has provided him with financial support for any equipment he may need.

After graduating from Chung Hua Middle school, Hsieh enrolled in Broadcasting studies at Oneworld Hanxin College. His music talent received recognition in 2005 when he became a restaurant performer.

Career

Early career 
In 2006, Hsieh participated in the "Xin Miao Cup” songwriting competition in Oneworld Hanxin College and won three awards: Best composition, Best performance and Championship. In the same year, he won the championship in the songwriting competition in the TV program “Shout Out! It’s Saturday Night” on NTV7. The judges were Jovi Theng, Nick Zhong, and Guoxiang Zhang; they signed Hsieh to be a singer under Echo Stone Records. In September 2007, he released the album "Yue Lu Xing 樂旅行" with Genie. In the album, he wrote 70% of the lyrics and music. In December of the following year, he was nominated for the Best New Artist in the Malaysia PWH Music Award.

Hsieh's first hit song released overseas was "Shang 傷" sung by the Chinese singer Daimo Li. The song served as a milestone in his music career and enabled him to produce many more songs one after another. In 2009, Hsieh officially started his career as a music producer. Over the years, he has participated in the production of many works including the hit song in Yixin Lin's album, album production for Ariel Zheng, radio station music for Chen Jiakai, concert director for Yiyi Chen, and debut EP for Sheena Yanting, etc.

Songwriter and producer 
Hsieh has worked with Warner Chappell Music for over ten years, and released songs all over Asia Pacific. His works include Crowd Lu’s "Your name engraved herein 刻在我心底的名字", Karen Mok’s "My Dear 親愛的", A-Lin’s "I’m not sorry 抱歉我不抱歉", Andrew Tan's "Broken 壞掉的我們", Angela Changs "Return 還", Daimo Li's "Shang 傷", Janice Yan's "Grim Reaper 閻羅王", Rainie Yang’s "Don’t Care Anymore 與我無關", Linong Chen and Lala Hsu’s "Unsure 一無所知", and Julia Pengs "When I look back 我想念我自己", etc. He has also worked with singers such as Momo Wu, Terry Lin, Wallace Chung, Hankyung, Ailing Tai, Mi Zhou, Yisa Yu, Della, etc.

Since 2011, Hsieh became the Director for the digital concert of Malaysian artists. He was also invited to perform theme songs for TV series, such as “Heart to heart 心點心", "Ni Zhi Dao 你知道", "My Sensei Nyonya 娘惹相思格", "Jie yau 解藥", etc.

In 2018, Hsieh has been nominated as the "Top 10 Original Song (international)" in the Malaysia PWH Music Award with Karen Mok's "My Dear 親愛的". In 2020, he won the award "Top 8 Award" in the Ultimate Song Chart Awards with Jason Chan’s "Gan Qing Zhe Hui Shi 感情這回事". In the same year, he collaborated with Singaporean musician 陳文華 and Malaysian lyricist Yuanting Xu to create Crowd Lu's "Your name engraved herein 刻在我心底的名字", which is the theme song of the movie in the same title. The song received great feedback in the market and has been awarded as the "Best Original Song" in the 57th Golden Horse Awards and "Song of the Year" in the 32nd Golden Melody Awards. Hsieh himself was also congratulated by the JKKN Assistant Director Dato Sebastian Ting Chiew Yew.

Entrepreneurship 
In 2014, Hsieh started Burger Music Studio with Zhenghao Wu and Yaojian Wang as partners. The business focuses on producing albums and singles, and it also serves as an original publishing (OP) company, aiming to support songwriters to sell their work.

Personal life 
He and his wife has known each other for about a decade since student life and were married in 2013. In 2014, Hsieh wrote a song "Popomama 婆婆媽媽" for his grandmother's 90th birthday as a tribute to the seniors in his family. In 2017, Hsieh's father passed away, and Hsieh also wrote a song for him, which was later released as "Ceng Jing You Ge Peng You 曾經有個朋友" sung by Don Chu. Whenever he has songs released, his family will always share the work to show support for his career. Hsieh is very grateful for all the encouragement and support he receives from his family, because they allow him to pursue his career without having to worry about anything.

Works

Personal albums

In group

Singles

Awards

References

Malaysian male singer-songwriters
People from Miri
1985 births
Living people
Malaysian people of Hakka descent